Bruree GAA club is a Gaelic Athletic Association club located in Bruree, County Limerick, Ireland. The club fields teams in both hurling and Gaelic football.

Honours

 Limerick Senior Hurling Championship (2): 1893, 2006
 Limerick Junior Football Championship: 2010

Notable players
 Stephen McDonagh
 Jim O' Brien
 James O'Brien

References

External links
 

Gaelic games clubs in County Limerick
Hurling clubs in County Limerick
Gaelic football clubs in County Limerick